The Supreme Council of Antiquities (SCA) was a department of the Egyptian Ministry of Culture from 1994 to 2011. It was the government body responsible for the conservation, protection and regulation of all antiquities and archaeological excavations in Egypt, and was a reorganization of the Egyptian Antiquities Organisation, under Presidential Decree No. 82 of Hosni Mubarak.

In January 2011, it became an independent ministry: the Ministry of State for Antiquities (MSA).

The first government body was the Department of Antiquities, established in 1858. This became the Egyptian Antiquities Organisation in 1971.

Role
The Secretary-General directed the SCA through the Administrative Council. He answered to the Minister of Culture.

The SCA was the only agent permitted to restore or preserve Egyptian monuments. It defined the boundaries around archaeological sites and required foreign archaeologists working in Egypt to report all discoveries and finds to the SCA before publication. This somewhat controversial rule led to the expulsion of some archaeologists from Egypt, but reduced the theft of archaeological finds dramatically and notified the authorities to set up security around new finds.

The SCA was also responsible for the recovery of antiquities previously stolen or illegally exported from Egypt: between 2002 and 2008, it retrieved 3,000 artefacts. It became embroiled in a dispute with the Egyptian Museum of Berlin over the bust of Nefertiti, which it claimed was removed from the country by deceit; previously it had asked for the return of the Rosetta Stone from the British Museum and the Dendara Zodiac from the Louvre.

Antiquities service 
Those who serve to preserve antiquities are in charge of the conservation and preservation of antiquities, as well as research and often give interviews and report on discoveries and work being done. In the 21st century they also face the difficult task of keeping monuments safe from a fringe of Islamist radicals who want the destruction of pharanoic monuments. Their official titles, depending on the years they served, have ranged from Director, to Director-General, to Chairman to Minister. The position may entail also, as was done by Zahi Hawass for many years, to stimulate tourism to Egypt, with charm and charisma. Sayed Tawfik was an Egyptologist who served from 1989–1990, when the body was called the Egyptian Antiquities Organization. 
At the end of 2011, Dr. Mohamed Ibrahim Aly was named antiquities minister and he promised to give new life to the body, by bringing in young archeologists and restarting projects which had been put on hold.

History

Department of Antiquities
In the 1850s, Auguste Mariette made discoveries at Saqqara and revived an interest in Egyptology. The government of Egypt was keen to tap the skills and the publicity Mariette could bring to the country and created the post of Conservator for him. 

Mariette needed little persuasion in any case, and brought his family with him. The following year, in 1859, the Department of Antiquities was created, a respected body that would endure for more than a century. Mariette's organisation did not always place the welfare of Egypt and the Egyptians at the top of its priorities; the prestige of France, if not of Mariette himself, could seem equally important to him. Nevertheless, he did provide the infrastructure that was required and his energy and determination gave the body the strong foundation of an identity and a credibility.

Mariette was followed by Gaston Maspero "as Director General of the Excavations and Antiquities of Egypt, and his big achievement was his examination of the mummy of Ramses II, found in 1884, in the presence of the Khédive and other high dignitaries. The mummy of this great conqueror was well preserved, revealing a giant frame and a face expressive of sovereign majesty, indomitable will, and the pride of the Egyptian king of kings. He then unbandaged the mummy of Ahmose-Nefertari, wife of King Ahmose I. of the Eighteenth Dynasty, beside which, in the same sarcophagus, had been discovered the mummy of Ramses III. The physiognomy of this monarch is more refined and intellectual than that of his warlike predecessor; nor was his frame built upon the same colossal plan. The height of the body was less, and the shoulders not so wide. In the same season Maspero also discovered an ancient Egyptian romance inscribed on limestone near the tomb of Sinuhe at Thebes. A fragment on papyrus had been preserved at the Egyptian Museum of Berlin, but the whole romance was now decipherable."

"Professor Maspero resigned his office of directorship on June 5, 1886, and was succeeded in the superintendency of excavations and Egyptian archaeology by M. Eugène Grébaut. In the same month Grébaut started upon the work of unbandaging the mummy of the Theban king Seqenenra Tao, of the Seventeenth Dynasty. It was under this monarch that a revolt against the Hyksos, or Shepherd Kings, had originated, in the course of which the Asiatics were expelled from Egypt. The history of this king has always been considered legendary, but from the signs of wounds present in the mummy, it is certain that he had died in battle. In the same season the mummy of Seti I. was unbandaged, and also that of an anonymous prince."

"The next season the work of clearing away the sand from around the Great Sphinx was vigorously prosecuted by Grébaut. In the beginning of the year 1887, the chest, the paws, the altar, and plateau were all made visible. Flights of steps were unearthed, and finally accurate measurements were taken of the great figures. The height from the lowest of the steps was found to be one hundred feet, and the space between the paws was found to be thirty-five feet long and ten feet wide. Here there was formerly an altar; and a stele of Thutmosis IV. was discovered, recording a dream in which he was ordered to clear away the sand that even then was gathering round the site of the Sphinx."

Egyptian Antiquities Organization
By the 1970s, the value of Antiquities to Egypt was well-understood: both as a permanent advertisement for its tourist industry, and as an instrument of cultural prestige, imbuing a sense of pride in the post-colonial era, and maintaining morale during the numerous internal and external conflicts affecting Egypt  since its independence. After more than a century of existence, the Department of Antiquities was therefore renamed in 1971.The new title sounded less bureaucratic, and suggested a dynamic agency: reflecting the value of the past to the present.

The concept appeared sound, but the value, both metaphorical and literal, of the antiquities 'industry' to Egypt indicated that, if anything, even more support and protection should be given. This led to the upgrade, firstly to a Supreme Council in 1994, then - in 2011 - to a full Ministry of State, devoted exclusively to a judicious development of the nation's heritage.

Sale room in the Egyptian Museum

In January 1881, Gaston Maspero succeeded Mariette as director of the Antiquities service (Service des Antiquités d'Egypte). In August of the same year, Amelia Edwards wrote to Maspero that thefts and robberies would probably decrease if the museum offered certified objects for sale, and that travellers would prefer to buy their ‘souvenirs’ at regulated prices at the Bulaq Museum rather than from locals. The decree of 16 May 1883 stipulated that the antiquities of the Bulaq Museum, or those that might be kept there or in other museums established in the future, were the property of the Egyptian state and for this reason were "inaliénables, insaisissables et imperscriptibles" (inalienable, unseizable, indispensable).

Nevertheless, probably in the same year, Maspero, assisted by Emil Brugsch, began to make a selection of the less important pieces to sell before they were included in the Bulaq collection. Gradually, the director introduced the official sale of antiquities in order to increase the financial resources of the Department of Antiquities and especially of the excavations. From June 1884, the sale of various objects and mummies is duly registered in the account books. It represents an important source of income for the service. Maspero himself buys small objects from the Antiquities Service for his personal collection. Many of them are now in the Egyptian collection of the Institut d'Egyptologie Victor Loret in Lyon.

The official sale of antiquities initiated by Maspero proved to be very lucrative for the Service des Antiquités d'Egypte (Antiquities service).

For this reason, a sale room (Salle de ventes) was opened in 1892 in the palace of Ismail Pasha in Giza, which became the seat of the Egyptian Museum in the last decade of the 19th century. It was located in room 91 on the ground floor, directly accessible from the outside. When the Egyptian Museum moved to Tahrir, in the early years of the 20th century, the sale room was located in room 56 on the ground floor, accessible from the western entrance. The Egyptian state continued to operate the sale room in the Egyptian Museum until 1979, selling original ancient Egyptian artworks and other artefacts there. From a packing list as well as from other sources, such as the pages of the register of the sale room or the museums' inventories and archives, which have already been checked or reconciled, it can be deduced that the objects sold were: Reliefs, architectural elements, offering tables, coffins, complete or fragmentary statues, statue heads or torsos, headrests, capitals (mostly Coptic), canopic jars, as well as stone or glass vessels, ushabtis, weights, amulets and scarabs. Despite the opinion that the objects sold to public institutions were more important than those sold to private collectors or dealers, we can see from the register of the sale room that the latter were also able to acquire very important objects. All of these works could subsequently be legally exported. Many objects that are now kept in private collections or public museums originated here.

Heads of Antiquities

Department of Antiquities
Director:
 Auguste Mariette (1858–1881) 
 Gaston Maspero (1881–1886) 
 Eugène Grébaut (1886–1892) 
 Jacques de Morgan (1892–1897) 
 Victor Loret (1897–1899) 
 Gaston Maspero (1899–1914) (bis)
 Pierre Lacau (1914–1936) 
 Étienne Drioton (1936–1952)
 Mostafa Amer (1953–1956) 
 Abbas Bayoumi (1956–1957) 
 Moharram Kamal (1957–1959) 
 Abd el-Fattah Hilmy (1959) 
 Mohammed Anwar Shoukry (1960–1964) 
 Mohammed Mahdi (1964–1966) 
 Gamal Mokhtar (1967–1971)

Egyptian Antiquities Organization
Director:
 Gamal Mokhtar (1971–1977) 
 Mohammed Abd el-Qader Mohammed  (1977–1978) 
 Shehata Adam (1978–1981) 
 Fuad el-Oraby (1981) 
 Ahmed Khadry (1982–1988) 
 Mohammed Abdel Halim Nur el-Din (1988) 
 Sayed Tawfik (1989–1990) 
 Mohammed Ibrahim Bakr (1990–1993)

Supreme Council of Antiquities 
Secretary-General:
 Mohammed Abdel Halim Nur el-Din (1993–1996) 
 Ali Hassan (1996–1997) 
 Gaballa Ali Gaballa (1997–2002) 
 Zahi Hawass (2002–2011)
 Mohamed Abdel Fattah (July–September 2011)
 Moustapha Amine (29 September 2011–2013)
 Mohammad Ibrahim (2013–?)
 Mostafa Waziri (since September 2017)

Ministry of State of Antiquities 
Minister of State:
 Abdelfattah al-Banna [nominated] 
 Zahi Hawass (2011)
 Mohamed Ibrahim Aly

Ministry of Tourism and Antiquities 

 Zahi Hawass 31 January 2011 – 3 March 2011
 Mamdouh Eldamaty from June 2014
 Khaled al-Anani from 23 March 2016

 Ahmed Issa (since 2022)

References

External links 

 The Supreme Council of Antiquities: Official website of the Supreme Council of Antiquities
 The Plateau: Official website of Dr Zahi Hawass
 EgyptMemory: images and products that document Egypt's History & Culture
 About the Supreme Council of Antiquities
 Ministry of Tourism and Antiquities

Government agencies of Egypt
Egyptian culture
Arab culture
Egyptology
Egypt, Antiquities, Supreme Council
1859 establishments in Egypt
Government agencies established in 1859